Black Bob may refer to:

Black Bob (comics), a fictional dog
Black Bob (horse), a British warhorse
Black Bob (Shawnee chief) (d. 1862 or 1864), Native American Shawnee chief
Black Bob (musician), American blues pianist
Robert Craufurd (1764–1812), nicknamed Black Bob, Scottish soldier
Bob Tuckett (born 1948), nicknamed Black Bob, professional light heavyweight/cruiserweight boxer of the 1970s

See also
Bob Black (born 1951), American anarchist
Bob Black (baseball) (1862 – 1933), American professional baseball player
Robert Black (disambiguation)